Glenea bicolor is a species of beetle in the family Cerambycidae. It was described by Bernhard Schwarzer in 1924.

References

bicolor
Beetles described in 1924